The name Sarah was used for seventeen tropical cyclones worldwide: fourteen in the Western Pacific Ocean (thirteen by the JTWC and one by the PAGASA) and three in the South Pacific Ocean.

In the Western Pacific:
Typhoon Sarah (1951)
Typhoon Sarah (1956)
Typhoon Sarah (1959) – Category 5-equivalent typhoon which devastated South Korea, killing at least 2,000 people; also known as the Miyakojima Typhoon
Typhoon Sarah (1962)
Tropical Storm Sarah (1965) (T6503, 03W)
Typhoon Sarah (1967) (T6727, 30W)
Tropical Storm Sarah (1971) (T7101, 01W)
Tropical Storm Sarah (1973) (T7319, 21W)
Typhoon Sarah (1977) (T7703, 05W, Elang)
Typhoon Sarah (1979) (T7919, 22W, Sisang/Uring)
Tropical Storm Sarah (1983) (T8301, 01W) 
Severe Tropical Storm Sarah (1986) (T8610, 09W, Iliang)
Typhoon Sarah (1989) (T8919, 22W, Openg)
Tropical Storm Fung-wong (2019) (T1927, 28W, Sarah)

In the South Pacific:
Cyclone Sarah (1983)
Cyclone Sarah (1994)
Cyclone Sarah (2010)

See also
Cyclone Sarai (2019), a similarly-named tropical cyclone in the South Pacific.

Pacific typhoon set index articles
Pacific hurricane set index articles
South Pacific cyclone set index articles